Cyrtepistomus is a genus of oriental broad-nosed weevils in the beetle family Curculionidae. There are at least 20 described species in Cyrtepistomus.

Species
These 27 species belong to the genus Cyrtepistomus:

 Cyrtepistomus albus Pajni, 1990 c g
 Cyrtepistomus bardus Marshall, 1941 c g
 Cyrtepistomus bicallosus Pajni, 1990 c g
 Cyrtepistomus castaneus (Roelofs, 1873) i c g b (Asiatic oak weevil)
 Cyrtepistomus championi Pajni, 1990 c g
 Cyrtepistomus chloris Pajni, 1990 c g
 Cyrtepistomus frontalis Pajni, 1990 c g
 Cyrtepistomus herbicola Pajni, 1990 c g
 Cyrtepistomus himachalensis Pajni, 1990 c g
 Cyrtepistomus infidelis Pajni, 1990 c g
 Cyrtepistomus jucundus (Redtenbacher, 1844) c g
 Cyrtepistomus lanatus Pajni, 1990 c g
 Cyrtepistomus necopinus (Faust, 1897) c g
 Cyrtepistomus pennosus Marshall, 1913 c g
 Cyrtepistomus pini Marshall, 1924 c g
 Cyrtepistomus planus Pajni, 1990 c g
 Cyrtepistomus qularis Pajni, 1990 c g
 Cyrtepistomus rudis Pajni, 1990 c g
 Cyrtepistomus sabulosus Magnano, 2009 c g
 Cyrtepistomus subcostatus Pajni, 1990 c g
 Cyrtepistomus sulcifrons Pajni, 1990 c g
 Cyrtepistomus tenuiclavis Pajni, 1990 c g
 Cyrtepistomus testatus (Faust, 1895) c g
 Cyrtepistomus tuberculatus Pajni, 1990 c g
 Cyrtepistomus varicolor Pajni, 1990 c g
 Cyrtepistomus victoriae Pajni, 1990 c g
 Cyrtepistomus vinctus Pajni, 1990 c g

Data sources: i = ITIS, c = Catalogue of Life, g = GBIF, b = Bugguide.net

References

Further reading

External links

 

Entiminae
Articles created by Qbugbot